The Expedition of Umar ibn al-Khattab to Turbah took place in July 628 CE, or in the 3rd month of the year 7 of the Islamic calendar (AH).

The expedition was led by Umar ibn al-Khattab, at the order of the prophet Muhammad.

Expedition to Turbah
After returning to Medina from the Campaign of Wadi al-Qura, Muhammad sent Umar ibn al-Khattab with 30 men, against a branch of the tribes of Hawazin at Turbah, a distance of 4 nights march from Medina. Turbah was on the way to Sana and Najjran. Umar's troop travelled by night and hid by day. By the time the Muslim army arrived at the habitation, Hawazin already got news of the impending Muslim attack and they fled for their lives, according to the Muslim scholar "Saifur Rahman al Mubarakpuri".

See also
Military career of Muhammad
List of expeditions of Muhammad
Muslim–Quraysh War

Notes

Umar
628
Campaigns ordered by Muhammad
Hawazin